Barshabba, whose name means "son of the deportation", was the first recorded East Syriac bishop of Merv. He attended the synod of Patriarch Dadishoʿ in 424. Barshabba, or at least his name, lies at the root of an elaborate legend about the introduction of Christianity to eastern Iran and central Asia.

The surviving versions of the legend of Barshabba are from no earlier than the 7th century. The only complete account of the legend is found in the Arabic Chronicle of Seʿert. An abbreviated Arabic version is in the Book of the Tower by Mārī ibn Sulaymān. These all derive from a Syriac original. Fragments of a Syriac version and 350 fragments of a Sogdian translation have been found in the East Syriac monastic complex of Bulayïq. He was venerated from eastern Iran to China, but no further west. He was venerated both in the Church of the East, with which the historical bishop was associated, and among the Melkites of central Asia. According to al-Bīrūnī, the Melkites of Khwarazm kept his feast on 21 June. A Sogdian gospel lectionary attests to the celebration of his feast in the Church of the East in China. The martyrology of Rabban Ṣalība gives his feast as 20 August.

In the legend, Barshabba was a descendant of Christians deported by Shapur I from Roman Syria to Iran. He was raised a Christian in Ctesiphon. He exorcised and converted Shirran, the sister or wife of Shapur II, around the time of Shapur's peace treaty with Rome (363). To get her away from Barshabba's influence, Shapur sent Shirran to the oasis city of Merv and ordered her to marry the local marzban, Shirvan. From Merv she sent for Barshabba and he became its first bishop. Together they evangelised the city and region. He strove to convert the Magi, built churches and founded a school. He died and was buried, but by a miracle came back to life and lived another fifteen years before dying a final time. In the Sogdian version, he is credited with founding monasteries in Fars, Gorgan, Tus, Abarshahr, Sarakhs, Marw al-Rudh, Balkh, Herat and Sistan. The legend, combined with the evidence of the synod, would give Barshabba a pontificate of at least 69 years. The legend is consistent with the archaeological evidence for the introduction of Christianity to Merv in the 4th century.

See also 
 Sergius of Samarkand

Notes

References

Further reading
Sebastian Brock (1995), "Bar Shabba/Mar Shabbay, First Bishop of Merv", in Martin Tamcke, Wolfgang Schwaigert and Egbert Schlarb (eds.), Syrisches Christentum Weltweit. Festschrift W. Hage (Münster: LIT), pp. 190–201.
Sebastian Brock (2011), "A West Syriac Life of Mar Shabbay (Bar Shabba), Bishop of Merv", in Dimitrij Bumazhnov, Emmanouela Grypeou, Timothy B. Sailors and Alexander Toepel (eds.), Bibel, Byzanz und Christlicher Orient: Festschrift für Stephen Gerö zum 65. Geburtstag, Orientalia Lovaniensia Analecta 187 (Leuven: Peeters), pp. 259–279.

5th-century bishops of the Church of the East
Christians in the Sasanian Empire